Landon Curt Noll (born October 28, 1960) is an American computer scientist, co-discoverer of the 25th Mersenne prime and discoverer of the 26th, which he found while still enrolled at Hayward High School and concurrently at California State University, Hayward.

Biography
Noll was born in Walnut Creek, California, United States.  At age 18, he became the youngest person to break the record for the largest known prime.  He has held or co-held the record three times.
He is also the co-inventor (with John Horton Conway) of a system for naming arbitrarily large powers of 10.
He also helped start the International Obfuscated C Code Contest, and is a co-inventor of the Fowler Noll Vo hash function.

He was also a member of the Amdahl Six team (John S. Brown, Bodo Parady, Curt Landon Noll, Gene W. Smith, Joel F. Smith, and Sergio E. Zarantonello) which discovered another record prime in 1989; this prime remains unusual as a record large prime as it was not a Mersenne prime.

Noll is an amateur astronomer. His work includes measuring the Solar parallax during the 2004 Transit of Venus as well as the search for Vulcanoid asteroids.

He was also involved in politics as a Sunnyvale, California city council member and vice-mayor.

Notes

External links
 Landon Curt Noll's home page
 Noll Primer Prover Bio
 Amdahl Six
 How High can you count?
 International Obfuscated C Code Contest
 Fowler Noll Vo hash

1960 births
Living people
American astronomers
20th-century American mathematicians
21st-century American mathematicians
Number theorists
American cryptographers
Modern cryptographers
American computer scientists
California State University, East Bay alumni
Linfield University alumni
California city council members
Scientists from the San Francisco Bay Area
People from Sunnyvale, California